William Wilson (March 19, 1773June 6, 1827) was a U.S. Representative from Ohio.

Born in New Boston in the Province of New Hampshire, Wilson attended the public schools and was graduated from Dartmouth College, Hanover, New Hampshire, in 1797. He studied law in Johnstown, New York, and was admitted to the bar.

He moved to Ohio and settled in Chillicothe about 1805. He engaged in the practice of law there before moving to Newark, Ohio in 1808, having been appointed chief judge of the court of common pleas, and served until 1823.

He was elected a member of the American Antiquarian Society in 1818.

Wilson was elected to the 18th, 19th, and 20th Congresses, serving from March 4, 1823, until his death in Newark, Ohio on June 6, 1827.  He served as chairman of the Committee on Expenditures in the Post Office Department in the 19th Congress. Wilson was interred in the Old Cemetery and was re-interred on March 23, 1853, in Cedar Hill Cemetery.

See also
List of United States Congress members who died in office (1790–1899)

References

Sources

1773 births
1827 deaths
Ohio state court judges
Dartmouth College alumni
Politicians from Newark, Ohio
Ohio National Republicans
19th-century American politicians
Burials at Cedar Hill Cemetery, Newark, Ohio
Democratic-Republican Party members of the United States House of Representatives from Ohio
National Republican Party members of the United States House of Representatives
Members of the American Antiquarian Society
People from New Boston, New Hampshire